Louise "Loulou" Lamotte (born 16 April 1981) is a Swedish singer and songwriter of American descent. Since 2019 she has been a member of the vocal group The Mamas.

Career
Lamotte is a member of the singer-songwriter band Soulectric. Lamotte also contributed to the released record Höj din röst vol. 2. Loulou Lamotte was a contestant on the Swedish Idol 2008 on TV4.

Melodifestivalen 2013 
In 2013, she was in the backing vocals alongside Oscar Zia in the Behrang Miri song "Jalla Dansa Sawa" performed at the Melodifestivalen 2013 in the Swedish selection process for Eurovision Song Contest 2013. Although the song failed to make it to the finals after a duel elimination round won by Anton Ewald and his song "Begging", the song gained great popularity with the Swedish public and the single was released immediately after the competition reaching number 4 on Sverigetopplistan, the official Swedish Singles Chart.

Melodifestivalen 2019 
Lamotte, now as a member of the vocal group The Mamas, was one of the choirgirls behind John Lundvik in Melodifestivalen 2019 with the song "Too Late For Love". Lundvik won and got to represent Sweden in the Eurovision Song Contest 2019, where he and The Mamas placed fifth in the final.

Melodifestivalen 2020 
Along with The Mamas, Lamotte participated in Melodifestivalen 2020 with the song "Move". In the first semifinal the group qualified for the 7 March final in the Friends Arena. The Mamas won Melodifestivalen with 137 points and was planned to represent Sweden in the Eurovision Song Contest 2020, but the contest was canceled due to the coronavirus pandemic.

Discography

Singles
Solo

Featured in

Notes

References

External links
Loulou Lamotte Myspace

Swedish songwriters
Idol (Swedish TV series) participants
Swedish people of American descent
1981 births
Living people
21st-century Swedish singers
21st-century Swedish women singers
Melodifestivalen contestants of 2023
Melodifestivalen contestants of 2021
Melodifestivalen contestants of 2020
Melodifestivalen contestants of 2019
Melodifestivalen contestants of 2013